Delft was a Dutch 56-gun fourth-rate ship of the line of the navy of the Dutch Republic and the Batavian Republic.

The order to construct the ship was given on 27 May 1782 by the Admiralty of the Meuse. Delft was commissioned on 16 May 1783 by the United Netherlands Navy.

On 24 December 1787 Delft set sail on a mission against the Barbary pirates and protected Dutch traders in the Mediterranean Sea.

For the ship's second mission starting 31 May 1793 Theodorus Frederik van Capellen became the new commanding officer. During this mission he freed 75 Dutch slaves from Algiers.

In 1795 the French conquered the Dutch Republic and the new Batavian Republic was founded. The French initially disarmed Delft because they feared that Orangist rebels would use her, but later the Dutch reactivated her to participate in the war with Britain. Gerrit Verdooren van Asperen became her captain.

On 11 October 1797 Delft took part in the Battle of Camperdown. After heavy fighting she struck to the British; she sank off Scheveningen four days later while being towed to Britain.

During the battle the British captured the Dutch  under Captain G.J. van Rijsoort. They renamed her HMS Delft, in honour of the brave resistance Delft had made in the battle.

Since 2001 till 2018 work had been under way in Rotterdam to build a replica of Delft at Historical Shipyard 'de Delft' in Delfshaven, near to the place where the original ship was built.

Citations

External links

Ships of the line of the Dutch Republic
Ships of the line of the Batavian Republic
Ships built in the Netherlands
1783 ships
Maritime incidents in 1797
Shipwrecks in the North Sea
Replica ships